Cymindis andreae is a species of ground beetle in the subfamily Harpalinae. It was described by Édouard Ménétries in 1832.

References

andreae
Beetles described in 1832